is a Japanese voice actress affiliated with Tokyo Actor's Consumer's Cooperative Society. She is best known for voicing Hiromi Oka in Aim for the Ace!, O-jirō in Little Ghost Q-Taro, and Mari Sakurano in Brave Raideen.

Biography

In 1968, she joined Gekidan Aoi Mi no Kai Union Pro and made her voice acting debut with Attack No. 1. In 1973, she was cast as Hiromi Oka, the protagonist of the Aim for the Ace, and was transferred to the Tokyo Actor's Consumer's Cooperative Society the next year.

On 18 February 2020, she was awarded the Merit Award at the 14th Seiyu Awards.

Filmography

Anime
1969
Attack No. 1, Ōki
1971
Little Ghost Q-Taro, O-jirō
1973
Aim for the Ace, Hiromi Oka
1975
Brave Raideen, Mari Sakurano
Time Bokan, Happy, Isosān
1976
Groiser X Knuck, Kouji Hoshikawa
Shin Don Chuck Monogatari, Fifi
1977
Ore wa Teppei, Kanako Uesugi
Nobody's Boy: Remi, Liz Acan
1978
New Aim for the Ace, Hiromi Oka
The Story of Perrine, shepherd boy
1979
Anne of Green Gables, Ruby Gillis
Misha the Little Bear, Parurun
1980
Muteking, The Dashing Warrior, Takomi
The Wonderful Adventures of Nils, Nilsen
1981
, Karikari
The Swiss Family Robinson: Flone of the Mysterious Island, Jack Robinson
1982
Little Pollon, Media
Maya the Honey Bee, Maggie
1984
Katri, Girl of the Meadows, Claus Kuusela
1985
GeGeGe no Kitarō, Hoshirō Tendō
, Daisuke
1988
City Hunter 2, Bloody Mary
2007
Love Com, Nobuko Ishihara's grandmother

Film
1979
Aim for the Ace, Hiromi Oka
1981
Jarinko Chie, Pekochan
1986
GeGeGe no Kitarō: The Strongest Yokai Army!! Disembark for Japan!

Tokusatsu
Choujyu Sentai Liveman, Colon
Tokusou Robo Janperson, Kevin, Carol/Black Carol

References

External links

1950 births
Japanese voice actresses
Voice actresses from Osaka Prefecture
Tokyo Actor's Consumer's Cooperative Society voice actors
Living people